S. plicata may refer to:
 Spathoglottis plicata, the large purple orchid, a terrestrial orchid species found from tropical and subtropical Asia to the western Pacific including Tonga and Samoa
 Styela plicata, a tropical to temperate tunicate species

See also
 Plicata (disambiguation)